The New Zealand Journal of History is an academic journal covering the history of New Zealand. It has been published by the University of Auckland since 1967.

References

External links

History journals
History of New Zealand
University of Auckland
Publications established in 1967
English-language journals